Rachael Mwine Arinaitwe also known as Rachael Arinaitwe Tibarokoka Mwine (born on 17 December 1983) Is a Ugandan Journalist, news anchor,  moderator and media personality who worked with NTV Uganda.

Early life and education 
Rachael was born to Lilian (mother) and Clement Tibarikoka (father) as the second child of four. Rachael grew up in Najjanankumbi and later Kyebando in Kampala, Uganda. She went to Joy primary school for her Primary education. She then joined Gayaza High School for her O-level education and Migadde College for A-level education. She then joined Uganda Christian University where she did Mass Communication and she majored in public relations.

Career 
After Campus, Rachael worked with Power FM Radio for five years before joined the Nation Media Group (NTV Uganda) where she worked for seven years up October 25, 2018 when she resigned. She then Andela, an international training and placement company for software developers that officially launched in Uganda, in July 2018. Rachael was also the Red Sofa Sessions by Red Enterprises that happened on March 1, 2018.

Personal life 
Rachael is married to Ben Mwine a radio personality since September 28, 2013 when they had their wedding.

See also 
NTV Uganda

References 

Ugandan women journalists
People from Central Region, Uganda
Living people
1983 births
Uganda Christian University alumni